Operation Lesa Pátria (Portuguese idiomatic expression associated to "crimes against the State") is a set of ongoing investigations led by the Federal Police of Brazil investigating financiers, participants, and organizers of coup d'état attempts in Brazil, particularly related to the attacks on the headquarters of the Three Powers on January 8, 2023, in Brasilia. The task force is considered permanent by the Federal Police, with "periodic updates on the number of warrants issued, people captured and fugitives". Operation Lesa Pátria is the largest police operation launched in Brazil since Operation Lava Jato (2014-2021).

Background

2022–2023 Brazilian election protests

Attacks on the headquarters of the Three Powers on January 8

Investigations 
On January 9, 2023, the day after the attacks, the Federal Police arrested in flagrante delicto 2,151 people who would have participated in the actions and were camped in front of barracks in Brasília. Of these, 745 (a little more than a third of those caught in the act) were released after identification, among them people over 70, people between 60 and 70 years old with comorbidities, and 50 women who were with children under 12 years old at the acts.

Initially, the investigations were facilitated by the suspects posting evidence of their crimes on social networks. In addition, volunteers created profiles and accounts to assist authorities with the identification of participants in the January 8 acts. Brazil's Federal Police also released an electronic address (e-mail) as a channel for denunciations.

The arrests are being carried out mainly in establishments of the Federal District Penitentiary System: the 19th Military Police Battalion (BPM), known as "Papudinha"; the Papuda Penitentiary Complex, composed of four male prisons; and the Federal District Women's Penitentiary, known as "Colmeia". According to the Federal Police of Brazil, those investigated should answer for several types of criminal charges, among them: violent abolition of the democratic rule of law; coup d'état; aggravated damage; criminal association; incitement to crime; destruction; deterioration or destruction of specially protected property.

As of March 13, 2023, the Attorney General's Office (PGR) has indicted 919 people for public incitement to crime and criminal association. Of these, 219 will also answer for more serious crimes (aggravated damage, violent abolition of the rule of law, and coup d'état). A total of 310 men and 82 women remain in prison, for a total of 392 people.

Notable targets

Ibaneis Rocha and Anderson Torres 
In the 1st phase of Lesa Pátria (January 20, 2023), the Federal Police of Brazil conducted an operation against Ibaneis Rocha (MDB-DF), former governor of the Federal District (DF), removed since January 9 by determination of Alexandre de Moraes, minister of the Supreme Court (STF). Search and seizure warrants were served in the office and home of Rocha, and his cabinet in the Buriti Palace (headquarters of the Government of the DF). The action, requested by the Attorney General's Office (PGR) and authorized by the STF, was aimed at investigating alleged "omissive commissive" acts of authorities on January 8.

A week earlier, Anderson Torres, former Secretary of Public Safety in Ibaneis Rocha's administration, had been arrested in Brasilia shortly after returning from Florida, where he had met with former president Jair Bolsonaro, for whom he had been Minister of Justice. The request for his arrest had been granted by Minister Alexandre de Moraes at the request of the Director General of the Federal Police. During the search and seizure warrants at Torres' house, the Federal Police found a coup draft that foresaw the establishment of a state of defense at the headquarters of the Superior Electoral Court (TSE) in order to annul the 2022 presidential elections. This document, interpreted as evidence of an attempted coup d'état, has been added to lawsuits investigating coup acts in Brazil.

Representatives and political leaders 

 José Ruy Garcia, councilman from Inhumas (GO);
 Antonio Clesio Ferreira, defeated candidate for mayor of Ouro Preto (MG);

Police and military officials 

 Colonel Jorge Eduardo Naime Barreto, former head of the Operational Department of the Military Police of the Federal District (PMDF);
 Captain Josiel Pereira César, deputy commanding general of the PMDF;
 Major Flávio Silvestre de Alencar, investigated for facilitating extremists' access to the Supreme Court building;
 Lieutenant Rafael Pereira Martins;

Bolsonarist influencers 

 Ramiro Alves da Rocha Cruz Júnior, known as "Ramiro dos Caminhoneiros";
 Luciano Oliveira dos Santos, known as "Popó Bolsonaro";
 Leonardo Rodrigues de Jesus ("Léo Índio"), nephew of former president Jair Bolsonaro;

People who became famous after their crimes 

 Antônio Cláudio Alves Ferreira, caught destroying Balthazar Martinot's watch during the invasion of the Planalto Palace;
 Maria de Fátima Mendonça Souza, known as "Dona Fátima de Tubarão";

List of phases (2023-ongoing) 
As of March 17, 2023, Operation Lesa Pátria had reached 8 phases, 130 search and seizure warrants, and 70 arrests (preventive and temporary).

See also 

 2022–2023 Brazilian election protests
 2023 Brazilian Congress attack
 Bolsonarism
 Terrorism in Brazil

External links 

2023 in Brazilian politics
21st century in Brasília
Articles containing video clips
Attacks on buildings and structures in 2023
Attacks on buildings and structures in Brazil
Attacks on legislatures
Electoral violence
Far-right politics in Brazil
Jair Bolsonaro
January 2023 events in Brazil
Luiz Inácio Lula da Silva
Occupations (protest)
Political riots
Protests against results of elections
Right-wing terrorist incidents
Riots and civil disorder in Brazil